Severe Tropical Cyclone Betsy impacted 8 island nations.

Meteorological history

In early January 1992, an equatorial westerly wind burst caused a surge of stronger than normal low level westerly winds, to develop on the northern side of the Southern Hemisphere monsoon trough to the east of New Guinea. Enhanced convection associated with the wind burst gradually became more organized and by late on January 5, a tropical depression had developed within the monsoon trough to the west of Tuvalu. Early on January 6, the JTWC initiated advisories on the depression and designated it as Tropical Cyclone 11P, as it moved westwards. During that day the system gradually developed further with the cloud system becoming more symmetrical, while strong upper-level outflow and weak vertical wind shear favored further development. Later that day, the FMS named the system Betsy at 19:15 UTC, after the system had developed into a category 1 tropical cyclone on the Australian tropical cyclone intensity scale.

After being named the system moved erratically towards the south-southeast, as it interacted with a mid troposphere trough of low pressure. Throughout January 7, Betsy continued to intensify under the influence of a strong upper level anticyclone, located to its north and developed an eye feature. Betsy subsequently changed its course and started to move towards the south-southwest, as it interacted with the upper level easterlies and a ridge of high pressure built to the south-east of the system. During February 8, the system became a category 3 severe tropical cyclone before it crossed central parts of Vanuatu early the next day, with the eye passing over, or very close to the islands of Ambrym and Malakula between 0000 and 0500 UTC.

Preparations and impact
Betsy directly affected the Pacific island nations of Vanuatu, New Caledonia, New Zealand and the Solomon Islands, while it also indirectly affected the island nations of Papua New Guinea, Fiji, Tuvalu and Kiribati.

Tropical cyclone Betsy directly affected three countries, and indirectly affected two others. Some meteorological data reported from Vanuatu, the worst affected during the passage of Betsy.

Solomon Islands
Betsy impacted the Solomon Islands Temotu Province between January 6–8, which had been impacted by Severe Tropical Cyclone Tia seven weeks earlier.

Vanuatu
Cyclone Betsy was the second of six tropical cyclones to affect Vanuatu during the 1991–92 season, seven weeks after Severe Tropical Cyclone Tia brought gale-force winds to northern Vanuatu. The system affected Vanuatu between January 7–9, with gale, storm and hurricane-force winds reported at various locations around the island nation including on Malakula Island.

On January 10, Vanuatu's Minister for Foreign Affairs, formally submitted a request to donor countries for foreign aid. As a result of this request two aircraft a French Guardian and an Australian Orion, arrived in Vanuatu during the next day for surveillance operations. The planes completed their operations early on January 12 and returned to their countries, before a donor aid meeting involving the Australian,
French, New Zealand and British high commissions was held later that day.

New Caledonia
Gale-force winds associated with Betsy, were experienced as far south as Nouméa.

Other islands
At around the same time parts of Kiribati, were affected by squally westerly winds. Five people died in accidents related to the strong winds, including one when the roof of a mission building collapsed. During January 7, heavy swell generated by the system caused flooding and minor damage on the Northern Tuvaluan islands.

See also

Typhoon Axel (1992) - Betsy's twin tropical cyclone

References

External links

Track Map of Cyclone Betsy near Vanuatu from the Vanuatu Meteorological Service
Images of the swell in Queensland from Peter 'Joli' Wilson

1991–92 South Pacific cyclone season
Category 4 South Pacific cyclones
Tropical cyclones in the Solomon Islands
Tropical cyclones in Vanuatu
Tropical cyclones in Kiribati